The men's marathon 10 kilometre event at the 2020 Summer Olympics was held on 5 August 2021 at the Odaiba Marine Park. It was the fourth appearance of the event, having first been held in 2008.

Florian Wellbrock won the gold medal for Germany, with a final time of 1:48:33.7. This was over 25 seconds ahead of silver medalist Kristóf Rasovszky of Hungary; Gregorio Paltrinieri of Italy took the bronze. 2016 gold medalist Ferry Weertman of the Netherlands came seventh.

Qualification

 
The men's 10 km open water marathon at the 2020 Olympics featured a field of 25 swimmers:

10: the top-10 finishers in the 10 km races at the 2019 World Aquatics Championships (maximum of 2 per NOC)
9: the top-9 finishers at the 2020 Olympic Marathon Swim Qualifier, open only to NOCs with no qualified swimmers (maximum of 1 per NOC)
5: one representative from each FINA continent (Africa, Americas, Asia, Europe and Oceania), based on the finishes at the 2020 Olympic Qualifier
1: from the host nation (Japan) if not qualified by other means. If Japan already has a qualifier in the race, this spot is allocated back into the general pool from the 2020 Olympic Qualifier.

Competition format

Unlike all of the other swimming events in the pool, the men's and women's marathon 10 kilometre races are held in open water. No preliminary heats are held, with only the single mass-start race being contested. This race is held using freestyle swimming, with a lack of stroke regulations.

Schedule
All times are Japan Standard Time (UTC+9)

Results

References

Men's 10000 metre marathon
Olympics
Men's events at the 2020 Summer Olympics